"Sensualidad" is a song by Puerto Rican rapper Bad Bunny, American singer Prince Royce, and Colombian singer J Balvin featuring producers Mambo Kingz and DJ Luian. It was released by Hear this Music on November 3, 2017 as a single. The song is the first top 10 hit for Mambo Kingz and DJ Luian on the US Billboard Hot Latin Songs chart. It also serves as Bad Bunny's first top 10 song as a lead artist on the chart.

Music video
The accompanying music video for "Sensualidad" was uploaded to Hear This Music's YouTube channel on November 2, 2017. It was directed by Fernando Lugo and filmed in the Dominican Republic.

Charts

Weekly charts

Year-end charts

Certifications

Release history

References 

2017 songs
2017 singles
Bad Bunny songs
J Balvin songs
Prince Royce songs
Latin pop songs
Number-one singles in Spain
Spanish-language songs
Songs written by J Balvin
Songs written by Bad Bunny
Songs written by Prince Royce
Songs written by Edgar Semper
Songs written by Xavier Semper